Gordon Polson (born 27 March 1959) is  a former Australian rules footballer who played with Footscray in the Victorian Football League (VFL).

Notes

External links 
		

Living people
1959 births
Australian rules footballers from Victoria (Australia)
Western Bulldogs players
North Ballarat Football Club players